Siluridae is the nominate family of catfishes in the order Siluriformes. About 105 living species of silurids are placed in 12 or 14 genera.

Although silurids occur across much of Europe and Asia, they are most diverse in Southeast Asia, beyond which their diversity decreases in temperate East Asia, the Indian subcontinent, Southwest Asia, and Europe. Silurids are apparently absent from much of central Asia. The family can be divided into two groups, a temperate North Eurasian clade and a more diverse subtropical/tropical South and Southeast Asian clade.

Notable species
Wels catfish, Silurus glanis
Phantom catfish, Kryptopterus vitreolus
Wallago attu
Wallagonia leerii
Aristotle's catfish
Amur catfish
Phalacronotus apogon
Ompok

Common features
The family Siluridae is very diverse, with not very many distinctive features among all species, but some major ones include gigantism, and smaller versions  of attributes that Catfish regularly have, such as smaller fins and whiskers. These catfish do not have spines before their dorsal fins or adipose fins, and their pelvic fins are either small or absent. The anal fin base is usually very long.

References

 
Fish of Europe
Fish of Asia
Catfish families
Taxa named by Georges Cuvier